is a town located in Hiyama Subprefecture, Hokkaido, Japan.

As of September 2016, the town has an estimated population of 5,575 and a density of 9.8 persons per km². The total area is 568.14 km².

Geography
Imakane is located in southern Hokkaido within Setana District, Hiyama Subprefecture. The town is on Route 230 at the junction of the Shiribeshi-Toshibetsu and Toshibetsu-Mena rivers. The main landmark and meeting point in the town center is De Molen, a large windmill.

Neighboring towns and village

 Shimamaki to the north
 Oshamanbe to the east
 Setana to the west
 Yakumo to the south east

Mountains
  981 m

Rivers
 
 Toshibetsu-Mena River

Dams

Climate

History
Imakane, at the time known as Hanaishi, was founded in the Kan'ei period between 1624 and 1643 after gold, silver and manganese were discovered in the upper Shiribetsu River, near Pirika/Hanaishi. Some of the gold mined from the area was used to build Nikkō Tōshō-gū, a Shinto shrine in Tochigi Prefecture dedicated to Tokugawa Ieyasu.

Agate was found in Hanaishi in 1877. Mining was started by Oshima Kanzaemon. Meanwhile, increasing numbers of people arrived in the area to mine existing seams of manganese, gold and silver and by the middle of the Meiji era many had settled in the Shiribetsu river area.

The town was granted independent status as the village of Toshibetsu and formed from the neighboring town of Setana in 1897. It was settled by Norioshi Shikata and 15 other families, including the Imamura and Kanamori houses. These families had arrived in the area during the preceding five years and laid out the town into 129 housing sites, a city hall and a police station.

Toshibetsu village formally received the name of Imakane in 1947 as part of its upgrade to town status.

The town's constitution was established on October 1, 1967. Imakane celebrated its 100th year of autonomous government on July 15, 1997.

Industry
Today Imakane's main industry is farming. Imakane is famous nationwide for potatoes, especially the Danshaku variety. Fishing is also widespread; yamame, ayu, unagi, and iwana can be found in the area.

Culture
Imakane has a number of festivals, including the Snow festival in mid February (usually the weekend after Sapporo's) and the Autumn Festival on September 19 and 20 every year.

Symbols
The symbol of Imakane comprises the meandering Toshibetsu River and the 1st letter of 農耕 (farming) which can be written in katakana as ノ and pronounced "no". This symbol was decided upon by a public competition on the town’s 70th anniversary (1967)

Another symbol of Imakane is a large windmill located in the center of town where the old train station stood. It is called "De Moren Imakane". 　The Name "De Moren" is Dutch for "windmill". In Spring the tulips come into bloom and is one of the symbols for Imakane.

Schools
Due to the steadily decreasing population, a number of schools have closed in recent years, including Yatsuka, Kinbara, Hanaishi and Kamioka elementary schools.

Imakane Junior High School has an exchange program with Burnside High School in Christchurch, New Zealand. Burnside High School students studying Japanese last visited Imakane in July 2016. Seven Imakane students visited Burnside High School in 2013. 
2008 marked the 20th anniversary of the mutual exchange between the two groups, and Burnside Vice-Principal Mrs. Hume visited Imakane along with a number of students. Special events were held to mark the occasion, along with the signing of a Friendship agreement between Imakane and Burnside High School.

Notable people from Imakane
Nobukazu Kuriki, mountaineer and entrepreneur
Hiroshi Suzuki, bobsledder
Chiyozakura Teruo, sumo wrestler

References

External links

Official Website 

Towns in Hokkaido